Bo Kramer is a Dutch para-wheelchair athlete. A wheelchair basketball player who represents the Netherlands, she won gold at the 2020 Summer Paralympics. She was described as "one of the top wheelchair basketball players in the world" by the BBC.

References

Date of birth missing (living people)
Living people
Paralympic wheelchair basketball players of the Netherlands
LGBT basketball players